Eily Malyon (born Eily Sophie Lees-Craston; 30 October 1879 – 26 September 1961) was an English character actress from about 1900 to the 1940s. She had a stage career in Britain, Australia and America before moving to Hollywood to perform in motion pictures.

History
The daughter of Harry Craston, a master boot and lawn tennis shoe manufacturer, and his wife, Malyon was born in the London district of Islington in 1879. Her parents divorced in 1882, and she accompanied her mother, the actress Agnes Thomas, touring the world. Consequently she received much of her education in convent schools in Belgium, England and America. She so enjoyed her stay at the Ursuline convents near Liège and Visé that she resolved to become a nun, but changed her mind after experience as understudy to her mother at Drury Lane. 

She gained further experience in repertory with the Stage Society in London. She spent some time in Australia, initially as a member of Ethel Irving's company, brought to Melbourne in 1911 by J. C. Williamson to play The Witness for the Defence, then played for Williamson in an English comedy company touring Milestones, in the role of Rose Sibley. 

She played in repertory and at the Little Theatre for Frederick Ward in Sydney 1915–1916 and for Gregan McMahon in Melbourne 1916–1918. She left Australia for a career on the American stage in September 1925.

Personal 
Malyon married Joshua Plumpton Wilson in Melbourne, Australia, on 9 December 1911. They divorced in May 1922.

Partial filmography

Born to Love (1931) - Nurse (uncredited)
Lovers Courageous (1932) - Landlady (uncredited)
The Wet Parade (1932) - Irish Drunk's Wife (uncredited)
Night Court (1932) - Hungry Woman in Court (uncredited)
Rasputin and the Empress (1932) - Woman Yelling 'Blessed Among Women!' (uncredited)
Today We Live (1933) - Wendy, the Maid (uncredited)
Looking Forward (1933) - Mrs. Munsey (uncredited)
Eight Girls in a Boat (1934) - Teacher (uncredited)
Nana (1934) - Nana's First Employer (uncredited)
His Greatest Gamble (1934) - Jenny
Great Expectations (1934) - Sarah Pocket
Limehouse Blues (1934) - Woman Who Finds Pug (uncredited)
Forsaking All Others (1934) - Mrs. Gordon - Customer (uncredited)
The Little Minister (1934) - Evalina
Romance in Manhattan (1935) - Miss Evans
Clive of India (1935) - Mrs. Clifford
The Florentine Dagger (1935) - Frau Fredericka
Les Misérables (1935) - Mother Superior
Mark of the Vampire (1935) - Sick Woman (scenes deleted)
The Flame Within (1935) - Murdock, Lillian's Housekeeper
The Farmer Takes a Wife (1935) - Angus' Wife (uncredited)
Diamond Jim (1935) - Organist (uncredited)
The Melody Lingers On (1935) - Sister Maria
I Found Stella Parish (1935) - Ship's Clothing Clerk (uncredited)
Kind Lady (1935) - Mrs. Edwards
Ah, Wilderness! (1935) - Nora - the Maid (uncredited)
A Tale of Two Cities (1935) - Mrs. Cruncher
The Widow from Monte Carlo (1935) - Lady Maynard
Little Lord Fauntleroy (1936) - Landlady
Dracula's Daughter (1936) - Miss Peabody - Nurse (uncredited)
One Rainy Afternoon (1936) - President of Purity League
The White Angel (1936) - Sister Colomba
The Devil-Doll (1936) - Laundry Proprietress (uncredited)
Anthony Adverse (1936) - Mother Superior
A Woman Rebels (1936) - Miss Piper (uncredited)
Three Men on a Horse (1936) - Miss Burns
Camille (1936) - Therese - Maid in Country House (uncredited)
Career Woman (1936) - Miss Brinkerhoff
God's Country and the Woman (1937) - Mrs. Higgenbottom (uncredited)
That I May Live (1937) - Cally Plivens (uncredited)
Night Must Fall (1937) - Nurse
Parnell (1937) - Irish Woman with Dead Child (uncredited)
Another Dawn (1937) - Mrs. Farnold
Rebecca of Sunnybrook Farm (1938) - Mrs. Turner
Kidnapped (1938) - Mrs. Campbell
The Young in Heart (1938) - Sarah
The Little Princess (1939) - Cook
The Hound of the Baskervilles (1939) - Mrs. Barryman
The Night Riders (1939) - Aunt Martha (uncredited)
Confessions of a Nazi Spy (1939) - Mrs. McLaughlin
On Borrowed Time (1939) - Demetria Riffle
Sabotage (1939) - Woman Standing Behind Henry and Laura
We Are Not Alone (1939) - Archdeacon's Wife
Barricade (1939) - Mrs. Little - Head of Mission
Young Tom Edison (1940) - Miss Lavina Howard, School Teacher
Untamed (1940) - Mrs. Sarah McGavity
Foreign Correspondent (1940) - College Arms Hotel Cashier (uncredited)
Flowing Gold (1940) - Cashier (uncredited)
Arkansas Judge (1941) - Widow Smithers
Reaching for the Sun (1941) - Landlady
Man Hunt (1941) - Lyme Regis Postmistress
Hit the Road (1941) - Cathy Crookshank
You're Telling Me (1942) - Mrs. Appleby
The Man in the Trunk (1942) - Abbie Addison
Scattergood Survives a Murder (1942) - Mrs. Grimes
I Married a Witch (1942) - Tabitha Wooley
The Undying Monster (1942) - Mrs. Walton (uncredited)
Shadow of a Doubt (1943) - Mrs. Cochran (uncredited)
Above Suspicion (1943) - Walmer Hotel Proprietess (uncredited)
The Man from Down Under (1943) - Sarah - Aggie's Maid (uncredited)
Jane Eyre (1943) - Mrs. Skatcher (uncredited)
Going My Way (1944) - Mrs. Carmody
The Seventh Cross (1944) - Fraulein Bachmann
Grissly's Millions (1945) - Mattie
Roughly Speaking (1945) - The Dean (uncredited)
Son of Lassie (1945) - Washwoman
Scared Stiff (1945) - Mrs. Cooke
Paris Underground (1945) - Madame Martin
She Wouldn't Say Yes (1945) - Spinster on Train (uncredited)
Devotion (1946) - Mrs. Thornton's Friend at the Ball (uncredited)
She-Wolf of London (1946) - Hannah
The Secret Heart (1946) - Miss Hunter
The Challenge (1948) - Kitty Fyffe (final film role)

References

External links

1879 births
1961 deaths
Deaths from cancer in California
English film actresses
Actresses from London
Actresses from Pasadena, California
20th-century American actresses
20th-century English actresses
British expatriate actresses in the United States
British expatriate actresses in Australia